Coca-Cola Starlight is a limited-edition variant of Coca-Cola. Introduced in 2022 as the first in the Coca-Cola Creations line, it was produced and distributed by The Coca-Cola Company and its bottlers. The beverage features a red color and a unique taste "inspired by space". In the United Kingdom, where it was a Zero Sugar variant, it was known as Coca-Cola Intergalactic. In South Korea, it was also known as Coca-Cola Stardust. In Thailand, it was also known as Coca-Cola Starshine.

History
The Coca-Cola Company announced the release of Coca-Cola Starlight on February 17, 2022. In a press statement, the company revealed the beverage has a "reddish hue" and that "Its taste includes additional notes reminiscent of stargazing around a campfire, as well as a cooling sensation that evokes the feeling of a cold journey to space." Oana Vlad, senior director for global brand strategy at the company, stated that the drink was inspired by Coca-Cola's partnership with NASA. Coca-Cola Starlight was launched alongside Coca-Cola Creations, an innovation platform of The Coca-Cola Company focused on selling limited-edition flavors of Coca-Cola. It landed in North American stores on February 21, 2022, and is also sold in Coca-Cola Zero Sugar format. It was discontinued on August 1, 2022 and succeeded by Coca-Cola Dreamworld later that month.

Flavor
Prior to the release of Coca-Cola Starlight, there were speculations as to its flavor. Among them were raspberry (originating from a 2009 study that the center of the galaxy may taste like raspberries) and s'mores.

Many have described the taste as similar to that of fruit, vanilla or cotton candy. Junk food review site Candy Hunting stated it "tastes like strawberry, marshmallow, and/or cotton candy". Aly Walansky of Food Network wrote it tastes "kind of like minty cotton candy sprinkled with vanilla".

References

Coca-Cola brands
Food and drink introduced in 2022